Ship of Ghosts is a novel by British author Nigel Hinton which was first published in 1999. It tells the story of a boy named Mick who became a sailor on a ship that was believed to be haunted.

Concept
The novel is based on a folk song called William Glenn which is about what happens when sailors discover a murder on their ship.

References

1999 British novels
Novels by Nigel Hinton